The Maybury–McPherson House, located at 502 E. 4th St. in Neligh in Antelope County, Nebraska, was built in 1887.  It was listed on the National Register of Historic Places in 1996.

It is a one-and-a-half-story wood-frame building which faces south.  It has a U-shaped  plan.  The listing includes a  frame garage.

References

External links

Houses on the National Register of Historic Places in Nebraska
Queen Anne architecture in Nebraska
Houses completed in 1887
National Register of Historic Places in Antelope County, Nebraska